Lundberg Family Farms, based in Richvale, California, United States, is a farm that produces rice, chips and their packaging, and that also markets organic foods. It is family owned and has been a pioneer in organic farming, especially rice products. It was the first business to produce and market a brand of organic rice in the United States. Today it is one of the United States' top brands of organic products, with  under management.

History

Albert and Frances Lundberg, the grandparents of the current Lundbergs, traveled west to Richvale, California, in 1937 from Nebraska, seeking their fortunes out west after the Great Depression. In Nebraska they had farmed wheat and corn, but they found that their  of hard clay in California were better suited for rice. Since the beginning they have been early pioneers in ecologically sound agriculture. While Albert Lundberg's neighbors were burning leftover rice stalks, for example, Albert devised a way to plow those stalks back into the field as fertilizer. Because of this early focus, the Lundbergs were the first American farmers to market a brand of organic rice products. In order to accomplish this, Albert's sons Wendell, Eldon, Harlan, and Homer had to build their own mill and establish a company which they called Wehah Farm, after their initials.

The Lundbergs have grown from that  to their current  under cultivation. An important factor in the Lundbergs has been education, with Harlan and Homer trained in agriculture, Eldon trained in civil engineering, and Wendell trained in industrial arts. The current CEO, Grant Lundberg, has a degree in agricultural business and a master's in agricultural economics.

Business model

Lundberg Family Farms is uncommonly large among organic farms. It is also vertically integrated (meaning that the systems for producing, handling, and distributing their products is also owned by Lundberg Family Farms), as many corporate agribusinesses are. Around 70 percent is farmed organically, but the company calls the remainder "eco-farmed", which means that it is farmed with pesticides and fertilizers that are carefully chosen for minimal environmental damage. On the eco-farmed portion they use one insecticide, eight selected herbicides, some conventional fertilizers, and fewer cover crops. The conventional methods mean less labor and less cost, allowing the company to compete in conventional markets.

The company is controlled by a ten-member board of directors composed of third-generation Lundberg family members and other industry professionals.

Sustainability

The Lundbergs have been consistently recognized for their efforts in sustainability. In 2004 Lundberg Family Farms was awarded the Green Power Leadership Award by the Environmental Protection Agency of the United States for offsetting 100% of its power with wind energy certificates, making it one of the largest purchasers in California and the first organic food manufacturer to do so.

The company is currently a member of the EPA's Green Power Partnership where it is listed as the only agribusiness running on 100% green power.

References

External links
Lundberg Family Farms official website
Wall Street Journal Top Small Workplaces 2008 "This organic-rice-products business has been family owned for 71 years -- and is set on keeping things that way. But Lundberg Family Farms -- formally known as Wehah Farms Inc. -- also offers employees who aren't family members the chance to build long, fulfilling careers."
Google books - Case study of Lundberg Family Farms
Draker Labs - Case study of Lundberg Family Farms electricity use "By shifting demand patterns, the farm leaves room to export electricity during the times of the day where the utilities pay the highest rates."

Companies based in Butte County, California
Farms in California
Organic farming in the United States
Rice organizations
Family-owned companies of the United States